Coulee Experimental State Forest is a state forest located in La Crosse County, Wisconsin, United States. It is administered by the Wisconsin Department of Natural Resources. The hilly terrain within the state forest is an excellent representation of Wisconsin's portion of the Driftless Area.

Notes

External links
Wisconsin Department of Natural Resources - Coulee Experimental State Forest
USGS Protected areas database

Wisconsin state forests
Protected areas of La Crosse County, Wisconsin
Research forests